Pitcairnia hitchcockiana is a plant species in the genus Pitcairnia. This species is native to Venezuela and Ecuador.

References

hitchcockiana
Flora of Venezuela
Flora of Ecuador